Lupinus albifrons, silver lupine, white-leaf bush lupine, or evergreen lupine, is a species of lupine (lupin). It is native to California and Oregon, where it grows along the coast and in dry and open meadows, prairies and forest clearings.  It is a member of several plant communities, including coastal sage scrub, chaparral, northern coastal scrub, foothill woodland, and yellow pine forest.

Description
It has a light blue to violet flower on  stalks. The leaves are silver with a feathery texture. It grows in sandy to rocky places below .

Cultivation
This plant grows as a wildflower in the hills and valleys of California.  It requires good drainage and needs little water once the roots are established.

Toxicity to livestock
The plant is deer-resistant due to the presence of the bitter-tasting alkaloid toxins anagyrine and lupinine. Because of these toxins lupines can negatively affect livestock, causing birth defects and decreasing weight especially in young, inexperienced cattle. When cows are under stress from lactating, especially in times of low forage availability, they will consume more lupine than usual.

Mission blue butterfly
The federally endangered mission blue butterfly requires either Lupinus albifrons, Lupinus formosus and Lupinus variicolor, on which their larvae feed. The butterfly becomes toxic itself when it feeds on the plant, leaving it with a bitter taste to deter predators.

Due to its potential danger to livestock, this lupine is removed from rangeland when possible, eliminating a crucial food plant from the butterfly's range.

Infraspecific taxa
Lupinus albifrons has five different varieties, three of which occur only in California, the other two occur in both California and Oregon:
Lupinus albifrons var. albifrons, silver lupine
Lupinus albifrons var. collinus, silver lupine
Lupinus albifrons var. douglasii, Douglas' silver lupine
 Lupinus albifrons var. eminens, silver lupine
Lupinus albifrons var. flumineus, silver lupine.

Photos

See also
California chaparral and woodlands 
California coastal sage and chaparral ecoregion

References

External links
Jepson Manual Treatment - Lupinus albifrons
CalFlora - Lupinus albifrons
Lady Bird Johnson Wildflower Center
Golden Gate National Recreation Area
Lupinus albifrons - Photo gallery

albifrons
Flora of California
Flora of Oregon
Flora of the Klamath Mountains
Flora of the Sierra Nevada (United States)
Natural history of the California Coast Ranges
Garden plants of North America
Drought-tolerant plants
Butterfly food plants